Nuclear factor 1 A-type is a protein that in humans is encoded by the NFIA gene.

Function 

Nuclear factor I (NFI) proteins constitute a family of dimeric DNA-binding proteins with similar, and possibly identical, DNA-binding specificity. They function as cellular transcription factors and as replication factors for adenovirus DNA replication. Diversity in this protein family is generated by multiple genes, differential splicing, and heterodimerization.[supplied by OMIM]

References

Further reading

External links 
 

Transcription factors